Dhanura  is a village in the southern state of Karnataka, India. It is located in the Bhalki taluk of Bidar district in Karnataka.

Demographics
 India census, Dhanura had a population of 5219 with 2699 males and 2520 females.

See also
 Bidar
 Districts of Karnataka

References

External links
 http://Bidar.nic.in/

Villages in Bidar district